Abū Muḥammad Mūsā ibn al-Mahdī al-Hādī (26 April 764 CE 14 September 786 CE) better known by his laqab al-Hādī (الهادي‎) was the fourth Arab Abbasid caliph who succeeded his father al-Mahdi and ruled from 169 AH (785 CE) until his death in 170 AH (786 CE). His short reign ended with internal chaos and power struggles with his mother.

Biography
Al-Hadi was the eldest son of al-Mahdi and al-Khayzuran and the older brother of Harun al-Rashid. He was very dear to his father and was appointed as the first crown prince by his father at the age of 16 and was chosen as the leader of the army.  Prior to his death, al-Mahdi supposedly favored his second son, Harun al-Rashid, as his successor, taking him on multiple military expeditions in 779 and 781 to train him to be the next caliph, as his own father prepared him, but died before the formal transfer of the crown prince title could occur.  Alternatively, al-Rashid was a general and may have accompanied his father to war to train for and carry out his profession. 

Regardless of the intent, when al-Mahdi died in 785, al-Hadi became the caliph at the age of 25. The youngest caliph to yet rule the Abbasids. His brother Harun al-Rashid became his crown prince at 22. This was a point of insecurity for al-Hadi as he spent the majority of his rule attempting to wrest the title of crown prince from al-Rashid - whether he was granted it before or after his father's death - and install his 7-year-old son Ja'far in his place. As Ja'far was very young and it went against law and wisdom to install him as crown prince, al-Hadi tried to put pressure on Harun and convince him to resign himself. So, Harun escaped from the capital and did not return there until the end of his brother's life. 

He was considered an "enlightened ruler" by his constituents and continued the "progressive" moves of his Abbasids predecessor. Like his father he was very open to the people of his empire and allowed citizens to visit him in the palace at Baghdad to address him. He was physically strong and famous for his bravery and talent in government and generosity. However, he was cruel, daring and zealous. Al-Hadi was especially malevolent to non-Muslim citizens and continued father's unfair policies and persecutions and quashed multiple internal uprisings. He crushed a Kharijite rebellion, repelled a Byzantine invasion and seized some territory in the process. 

Al-Hadi was also notorious for his cruelty and persecution of the Sayyids and the Shia, he imposed further restrictions on the Alids and the remaining descendants of the Umayyad caliphate, and treated them cruelly. He cut all the allowances al-Mahdi previously assigned them due to fear of an Alid uprising. He ordered his agents to watch all 'Alids' activities and place some spies among them  and ordered them to register their presence daily with local authority. In 786, the Alids of Hijaz led by Ali ibn Husayn staged an uprising in response to these conditions. They gained control of Medina, released prisoners, imprisoned Abbasid agents, and made Masjid al-Nabi his command center. Then, the set out to Makkah, were denied entry by its people and forced to confront the Abbasid army led by al-Hadi in the valley of Fakh, whereupon Ali ibn Husayn and his companions were defeated and killed. This event became famous, and ibn Husayn became known as Shahid Fakhkh (the martyr of Fakhkh). However, ibn Husayn's cousin, Idris bin Abdallah, escaped to Morocco aided by Wadih, an Egyptian postal manager, where he founded the Idrisi state. After the event of Fakh, al-Hadi accused Imam al-Kazim, one of his brother's advocates, of provoking the revolutionaries. He arrested the Imam and sentenced him to execution, but died before he could implement his decision.

There was no wanting for internal conflicts as well. Al-Khayzuran, his mother, reportedly wished to continue to engage in politics as she had become accustomed to during al-Mahdi's reign: "Khayzuran wanted to dominate her son. She continued to give audiences in her chambers and discuss state affairs: 
"She continued to monopolize decision-making without consulting him (al-Hadi), al-Khayzuran became the most powerful figure in the empire. She behaved as she had before, during the reign of al-Mahdi ... . People came and went through her door." Al-Hadi, however, opposed her participation in state affairs. He was not inclined to allow her displays of authority and attempted to exclude her from politics, reportedly saying: "it is not in the power of women to intervene .. . in matters of sovereignty. Look to your prayers and your prayer beads." The harem system first became fully institutionalized in the Islamic World under the Abbasid caliphate, when the Abbasid harem was established. At this point, however, Muslim women had not yet been fully secluded from society in a harem. 

The growing seclusion of women and decline of women's rights that would permeate the Abbasid Caliphate and the region's latter nations were illustrated by the power struggle between the Caliph al-Hadi and his mother al-Khayzuran, who refused to live in seclusion but instead challenged the power of the Caliph by giving her own audiences to male supplicants and officials and thus mixing with men. Her son considered this improper, and he publicly addressed the issue of his mothers public life by assembling his generals and asked them:
'Who is the better among us, you or me?' asked Caliph al-Hadi of his audience.
'Obviously you are the better, Commander of the Faithful,' the assembly replied.
'And whose mother is the better, mine or yours?' continued the caliph.
'Your mother is the better, Commander of the Faithful.'
'Who among you', continued al-Hadi, 'would like to have men spreading news about your mother?'
'No one likes to have his mother talked about,' responded those present.
'Then why do men go to my mother to speak to her?'

Al-Khayzuran would not be oppressed or silenced, much to al-Hadi's chagrin. Al-Tabari says others refer to al-Hadi's overtures to Harun. One account al-Tabari cites has al-Hadi attempting to poison his mother:
"Yahya b. al-Hasan related that his father transmitted the information to him, saying: I heard Kalisah telling al-'Abbas b. al-Fadl b. al-Rabi that Musa sent to his mother al-Khayzuran a dish of rice, saying, "I found this tasty and accordingly ate some of it, so you have some too!" Khalisah related: But I said to her, "Don't touch it until you investigate further, for I am afraid that it might contain something to your detriment." So they brought in a dog; it ate some and fell down dead. Musa sent to al-Khayzuran afterwards and said, "How did you like the dish of rice?" She replied, "I enjoyed it very much." He said, "You can't have eaten it, because if you had, I would have been rid of you. When was any Caliph happy who had a mother (still alive)?" (v. 30 pp. 43–44)

Al-Hadi moved his capital from Baghdad to Haditha shortly before his death.

Al-Hadi died in Baghdad at the age of 26 in 786, after ruling for only a year and two months. His brother, Harun al-Rashid, performed his funeral prayer. He was buried in 'Isa Abad. Al-Tabari notes varying accounts of this death, e.g. an abdominal ulcer or assassination prompted by al-Hadi's own mother. The note on p. 42 of volume 30 of the SUNY translation of al-Tabari cites pp. 288–289 of the Kitab al-'Uyun for the possibility that al-Khayzuran feared al-Hadi would recover from his illness and thus had slave girls suffocate him. Al-Tabari (v. 30 p. 42f) notes al-Hadi's assertion of independence from his mother, his forbidding her further involvement in public affairs and his threatening Harun's succession. This note continues, "Certainly, his death appears as too opportune for so many people concerned that it should have been a natural one." The famous Muslim historian Ibn Khaldun discredited this claim. 

Al-Hadi was succeeded by his younger brother, Harun al-Rashid.

Caliphate
His short reign was fraught with numerous military conflicts. The revolt of Husayn ibn Ali ibn Hasan broke out when Husayn declared himself caliph in Medina. Al-Hadi crushed the rebellion and killed Husayn and many of his followers, but Idris bin Abdallah, a cousin of Husayn, escaped and aided by Wadih, the Egyptian postal manager, reached Morocco where he later founded the Idrisi state in 788. Al-Hadi also crushed a Kharijite rebellion and repelled a Byzantine invasion. The Abbasid armies actually seized some territory from the latter.

Al-Hadi died in 786. al-Tabari notes varying accounts of this death, e.g. an abdominal ulcer or assassination prompted by al-Hadi's own mother. Al-Tabari (v. 30 p. 42f) notes al-Hadi's assertion of independence from his mother, his forbidding her further involvement in public affairs and his threatening Harun's succession. Al-Tabari says others refer to al-Hadi's overtures to Harun. One account al-Tabari cites has al-Hadi attempting to poison his mother:

"Yahya b. al-Hasan related that his father transmitted the information to him, saying: I heard Kalisah telling al-'Abbas b. al-Fadl b. al-Rabi that Musa sent to his mother al-Khayzuran a dish of rice, saying, "I found this tasty and accordingly ate some of it, so you have some too!" Khalisah related: But I said to her, "Don't touch it until you investigate further, for I am afraid that it might contain something to your detriment." So they brought in a dog; it ate some and fell down dead. Musa sent to al-Khayzuran afterwards and said, "How did you like the dish of rice?" She replied, "I enjoyed it very much." He said, "You can't have eaten it, because if you had, I would have been rid of you. When was any Caliph happy who had a mother (still alive)?" (v. 30 pp. 43–44)

The note on p. 42 of volume 30 of the SUNY translation of al-Tabari cites pp. 288–289 of the Kitab al-'Uyun for the possibility that al-Khayzuran feared al-Hadi would recover from his illness and thus had slave girls suffocate him. This note continues, "Certainly, his death appears as too opportune for so many people concerned that it should have been a natural one." The famous Muslim historian Ibn Khaldun discredited this claim.

Al-Hadi moved his capital from Baghdad to Haditha shortly before his death.

Family
Al-Hadi had two wives. One was Lubabah, the daughter of Ja'far, son of Caliph al-Mansur. The second was Ubaidah, daughter of Ghitrif ibn Atta and thus the niece of Al-Khayzuran bint Atta (Ghitrif ibn Atta's sister). One of his concubines was Amat al-Aziz, who had belonged to Rabi ibn Yunus, the powerful and ambitious chamberlain of caliphs al-Mansur and al-Mahdi. She was first presented to al-Mahdi, who, inturn presented her to al-Hadi. She was his favourite concubine, and bore him his two oldest sons. After al-Hadi's death Harun al-Rashid married her. Another concubine was Rahim, who was the mother of his son, Ja'far. His other sons were al-Abbas, Abdallah, Ishaq, Isma'il, Sulayman and Musa. Of the two daughters, one was Umm Isa, who married Caliph al-Mamun, and the other was Umm al-Abbas, who was nicknamed Nunah. All of them were born of concubines. His two sons, Isma'il and Ja'far married Harun-Rashid's daughters, Hamdunah and Fatimah respectively.

Succession
Al-Hadi was succeeded by his younger brother, Harun al-Rashid. Upon his accession, Harun led Friday prayers in Baghdad's Great Mosque and then sat publicly as officials and the layman alike lined up to swear allegiance and declare their happiness at his ascent to Amir al-Mu'minin. He began his reign by appointing very able ministers, who carried on the work of the government so well that they greatly improved the condition of the people.

See also
 Ubaydallah ibn al-Mahdi brother of al-Hadi
 Ibrahim ibn al-Mahdi brother of al-Hadi
 Ulayya bint al-Mahdi sister

References

Bibliography 

al-Masudi, The Meadows of Gold, The Abbasids, transl. Paul Lunde and Caroline Stone, Kegan Paul, London and New York, 1989

764 births
786 deaths
Arab Muslims
8th-century Arabs
8th-century rulers in Asia
8th-century rulers in Africa
8th-century rulers in Europe
8th-century Abbasid caliphs
8th century in the Abbasid Caliphate
One Thousand and One Nights characters
Sons of Abbasid caliphs